Eugene Offield (September 10, 1927 – April 27, 2005) was an American football player and coach. He served as the head football coach at Trinity University in San Antonio, Texas from 1970 to 1971, compiling a record of 13–8. Offield was selected by the San Francisco 49ers in the 1952 NFL Draft. He coached high school football in the state of Texas and was an assistant football coach at New Mexico State University from 1966 to 1967.

Head coaching record

References

External links
 

1927 births
2005 deaths
American football centers
Hardin–Simmons Cowboys football players
New Mexico State Aggies football coaches
Trinity Tigers football coaches
High school football coaches in Texas
People from Breckenridge, Texas
Players of American football from Texas